Anna E. Song is a South Korean-born American politician who served on the Santa Clara County School Board for twenty years. She is best known for being California's first female South Korean-born elected official.

Political career

Song was first elected to the Santa Clara County School Board in 2000, becoming the first Korean American elected in Santa Clara County. Song served as Board president in 2004, and she won overwhelming re-election to a second four-year Board term that fall.  Her reelection to the Board in 2008 was a more contested race — Song prevailed with 53.73% of the vote against Milpitas City Councilwoman Carmen Montano.  Song also won re-election in 2012 against Berryessa School Board Member David Neighbors — earning 58% of the vote despite more than a quarter million dollars ($250,000) spent against her in the campaign.  Anna Song was awarded the prestigious John F. Kennedy, Jr. Award from the California Democratic Party in 2002.

Song ran in the 2008 primary for the California's 22nd State Assembly district.

2020 California Assembly run
On May 12, 2019, Song announced that she would run for the California's 25th State Assembly district in 2020. She ran to succeed incumbent Kansen Chu, who was not seeking reelection.  She was defeated in the March 3 primary. That same year, she was defeated in her reelection bid for Santa Clara County School Board by Victoria Chon.

Personal life 

Song, a resident of Santa Clara, California, is the mother of Nicholas and Timothy.  Song holds a BA from the Franciscan University of Steubenville and has completed graduate courses at the Franciscan School of Theology in Berkeley, California.

External links
 Biography on the Santa Clara County Office of Education web site
 Santa Clara County Board of Education willing to foreclose on former superintendent 
 Mercury News editorial: Santa Clara County board should renegotiate mortgage with De La Torre

References

Living people
American women of Korean descent in politics
California politicians of Korean descent
Franciscan University of Steubenville alumni
People from Santa Clara, California
South Korean emigrants to the United States
Year of birth missing (living people)
21st-century American women politicians
San Francisco Bay Area politicians
21st-century American politicians